Jay's Selection is a compilation album released by British funk/acid jazz band Jamiroquai. The album features a selection of tracks chosen and mixed by lead singer Jay Kay. The album was released exclusively in Japan in 1996, and has never been available in the United Kingdom.

Track listing

References

Jamiroquai compilation albums
1996 compilation albums
Mixtape albums